The Washington International School (abbreviated as WIS;) is a private international school in Washington, DC.

Established in 1966, WIS was the first school in the Washington area to offer the International Baccalaureate (IB) program.

The school has two campuses: the primary school (grades PK–5) in Georgetown, and the middle and upper school (grades 6–12) in Cleveland Park. The middle and upper school campus is located on the grounds of Marjorie Merriweather Post's Tregaron Estate.

The Washington International School's upper school was ranked as the 73rd most challenging high school in the country and the most challenging high school in the Washington, D.C., area by the Washington Post's "Ranking America's most challenging high schools" article in 2016. Popular school ranking website Niche listed it as the eighth best private high school in the D.C. area.

History 
Washington International School (WIS) was founded in 1966 to serve the international community in the D.C. area. During the post-World War II era, many international schools were founded by a particular community or nationality and were "international" in the sense that students from other nationalities were accepted. From the very beginning, founder Dorothy Goodman envisioned that the school would educate children to become global citizens and the early curriculum reflected her vision. Children were taught several different languages and about world cultures, literature and history. In 1969, with assistance from the Ford Foundation, WIS expanded its campus with the purchase of the former Wendell Phillips School, which had closed a number of years before. In 1980 the Tregaron country house and estate was purchased and has been the site of the Middle (grades 6–8) and Upper Schools (9–12) ever since. The Elementary School moved out of the former Wendell Phillips School building in 1998 and the property was sold and developed into private housing.

Athletics 

In 2010, WIS won finals of the soccer PVAC tournament in a 2–0 win.

Affiliation 
Washington International School is affiliated with the National Association of Independent Schools, the Council of International Schools, the Middle States Association of Colleges and Schools, and the European Council of International Schools.

Notable alumni 
Sarah "Sally" Otto '85: Evolutionary Biologist, 2011 MacArthur Fellow, Member of the US National Academy of Sciences
Molly Neuman '89: Musician
Julia Vogl '03: Artist

Filming at WIS 

The mental hospital scene in the Pelican Brief was filmed in the mansion of the Tregaron Campus.
The humor coach scene in Borat: Cultural Learnings of America for Make Benefit Glorious Nation of Kazakhstan was filmed in the Mansion (Room 205) of the Tregaron Campus.
Several scenes in Advise and Consent were also filmed in the mansion of the Tregaron Campus.

References

External links 

 

Cleveland Park
Georgetown (Washington, D.C.)
Private K-12 schools in Washington, D.C.
International schools in the United States
International Baccalaureate schools in Washington, D.C.
Educational institutions established in 1966
1966 establishments in Washington, D.C.